The 'Earlygold' mango (or, 'Early Gold') is an early-season mango cultivar that originated in Pine Island, Florida.

History 
The original tree was grown on the grove of Frank Adams in Pine Island, Florida. For decades the parentage of the tree was unknown but a pedigree analysis indicated that Haden was the likely parent. Scions were sent to the Sub-Tropical Research Station near Miami, Florida, and a grafted tree was planted there in 1942. A distinctive characteristic of the tree is its early fruiting season, which begins in May.

Description 
The fruit is oblong, averaging less than a pound in weight and having a small lateral beak. The flesh is dark yellow and fiberless, and is sweet and aromatic. Ripens from May to June.

The tree is a moderately vigorous grower.

References 

Mango cultivars
Flora of Florida